Jawbreaker may refer to:

 Gobstopper, a hard candy with multiple layers

Arts and entertainment
 Jawbreakers (album), an album by Eddie "Lockjaw" Davis and Harry "Sweets" Edison
 Jawbreaker (band), an American rock band
 Jawbreakers (duo)
 Jawbreaker (film), a 1999 American film
 Jawbreaker (Transformers), several fictional characters in the Transformers universes
 Jawbreaker (TV series), a Canadian talk show
 Jawbreaker (video game), a 1981 Pac-Man clone
 Jawbreaker (Windows Mobile game), a 2003 video game
 "Jawbreaker", a song by The Dead Weather from Sea of Cowards
 "Jawbreaker", a song by Judas Priest from Defenders of the Faith 
"Jawbreaker", a song by Machine Gun Kelly (musician)

Other uses
 Jawbreaker, the code name for the CIA team that operated in Afghanistan in September 2001
 Jawbreaker: The Attack on bin Laden and al-Qaeda, a book by Gary Berntsen
 Jawbreaker, a type of professional wrestling throw

See also 
 Ed, Edd n Eddy: Jawbreakers!, a 2003 video game